Auster was a British aircraft manufacturer.

Auster may also refer to:

Places
 Auster Glacier, located in East Antarctica
 Auster Islands, East Antarctica
 Auster Pass, located in East Antarctica
 Auster Point, located in West Antarctica

Other uses
 Auster (surname)
 Auster rookery, an Emperor penguin rookery in Antarctica
 19861 Auster, an asteroid 
 Taylorcraft Auster, a British WW2 military liaison and observation aircraft
 Auster (wind), the south wind  in Roman mythology